Vickie Ann Chapman is a former Australian politician, representing the South Australian House of Assembly seat of Bragg for the South Australian Division of the Liberal Party of Australia between the 2002 election and May 2022. Chapman served as the Deputy Premier of South Australia and Attorney-General between 19 March 2018 and 22 November 2021 in the Marshall government. She was the first woman to hold either post.

Chapman has previously served as deputy leader of the Liberal Party from 2006 to 2009, and became deputy leader again in 2013. In that capacity, she served as Deputy Leader of the Opposition between 30 March 2006 and 4 July 2009, and again between 4 February 2013 and 19 March 2018. She was also the Shadow Attorney-General and Shadow Minister for State Development, having gained the extra portfolio of State Development in a cabinet reshuffle on 13 January 2016.

Early life

Chapman was born on Kangaroo Island. One of seven children, Chapman attended the Kangaroo Island Parndana Area School, and, following the death of her mother, at age 12 she later attended Pembroke School in Adelaide. She studied a law degree at the University of Adelaide and graduated in 1979 as a barrister.

Chapman's father, Ted, was a member of the Liberal and Country League and then the South Australian Division of the Liberal Party of Australia in the South Australian House of Assembly. A Liberal moderate, Ted was a member of the Steele Hall-led Liberal Movement faction in the 1970s and Agriculture Minister in the David Tonkin government. As a young girl, Chapman assisted her father in Liberal campaigns for office.

Parliament

1990s
As the Liberal Party state president from 1992–95, Chapman attempted to win Liberal preselection for the federal division of Barker in 1998. Her husband, David, died in 2001 and she moved from Wayville to Tusmore with her two children. She again tried to win preselection, this time for the safest Liberal seat in the metropolitan area, Bragg, located in Adelaide's wealthy eastern suburbs.

2000s
When sitting member Graham Ingerson resigned, Chapman contested preselection against Liberal minister Michael Armitage, who was seeking to move from his marginal seat of Adelaide. Chapman easily gained preselection and retained Bragg with a slight 0.4-point two-party swing at the 2002 state election when the Liberals lost government. However, she won 61.9 percent of the primary vote, easily enough to retain the seat outright.

Chapman immediately joined the front bench, assuming the shadow portfolios of Education and Children's Services. She was soon touted by some quarters, within her party and in the media, as a future Liberal leader. In other quarters, however, Chapman was seen as a continuation of the factional battles that have long plagued the SA Liberals.

The Liberals were cut down to only 15 seats at the 2006 election landslide. Chapman herself suffered a substantial 6.8-point two-party swing, but still retained Bragg with a comfortable majority of 12.6 percent, leaving Bragg as the only safe Liberal seat in Adelaide and one of only four safe Liberal seats statewide. Chapman was elected as deputy Liberal leader, and hence Deputy Leader of the Opposition, in an unexpected joint ticket with factional rival Iain Evans. Strong backing was received from federal Sturt MP Christopher Pyne, a longtime factional ally of Chapman, as well as another prominent boss of the SA Liberals' moderate faction, former Premier Dean Brown. She retained the deputy's post when Martin Hamilton-Smith ousted Evans as leader in 2007.

Hamilton-Smith called a leadership and deputy leadership spill for 4 July 2009. Chapman ran against Hamilton-Smith for the leadership, but received only 10 votes, against Hamilton-Smith's 11, with Evans abstaining. Conservative Isobel Redmond was elected to the deputy leadership to replace Chapman. Hamilton-Smith called another leadership spill to take place on 8 July 2009, in an attempt to gain a more decisive mandate, but two days prior to the spill, he announced he would not run. Chapman again ran for the leadership but received only 9 votes, against Redmond's 13. Steven Griffiths was elected deputy leader 8 votes to 6 for Mitch Williams.

2010s
Despite having attempted to previously oust Hamilton-Smith as leader and having attempted to later defeat Redmond in a leadership ballot, Chapman voted for Hamilton-Smith in his successful bid as deputy leader on 31 March 2010 in a vote held after the third consecutive Liberal loss at the 2010 election where Chapman gained a substantial 9.1-point two-party swing. Voting for Hamilton-Smith as deputy meant not voting for Evans. Chapman drew headlines in the last week before the 2010 election for not being willing to publicly refuse challenging Redmond for the leadership and faced accusations, particularly by Hamilton-Smith, of derailing the Liberal campaign, with "Chapman Could Challenge" posters hung beneath many of the Liberal "Redmond is Ready" posters.

Chapman was reappointed deputy opposition leader on 4 February 2013, and chose to announce she would rule out challenging new leader Steven Marshall.

Upon the fourth consecutive Liberal loss at the 2014 election, Chapman suffered a 1.5-point two-party swing but still retained Bragg with a comfortably safe 68.7 percent two-party vote. After the Liberal party won the election at the 2018 election, she was sworn in as Deputy Premier of South Australia.

2020s
Chapman was additionally appointed Minister for Planning and Local Government on 29 July 2020. Chapman lost a vote of non-confidence as Deputy Premier in the South Australian Parliament on 18 November 2021 after a parliamentary inquiry found her conflict of interest as Minister for Planning and Local Government and recommended for her to be found guilty of contempt of parliament for misleading the house. On 22 November 2021, she resigned as Deputy Premier and Minister for Planning and Local Government, and stepped down as Attorney-General while officially still holding the role and remaining in cabinet. On 3 May 2022, the Ombudsman's Report into the allegations exonerated Chapman of all wrongdoing, finding she had no conflict of interest.

Chapman retained her seat in parliament at the 2022 South Australian state election, despite a swing against her party which resulted in a change of government. A month after the election, Chapman announced her intent to resign from parliament. She officially resigned on 31 May 2022, with her successor to be elected in a by-election on 2 July 2022.

Personal life 
One of her children is Channel 7 reporter Alex Hart.

References

External links
Official website: vickiechapman.com.au

Further reading
The Liberal leadership; The Advertiser (Adelaide). 12 October 2005.
Vickie's island in the suburbs. Sunday Mail (Adelaide). 2 January 2005.
Vickie Chapman: The woman most likely. The Advertiser (Adelaide). 26 October 2002.
Chapman in the front line. The Advertiser (Adelaide). 25 April 2002.
Libs line up in battle for blue-ribbon seat of Bragg. The Advertiser (Adelaide) 15 January 2001.

|-

|-

|-
|-

|-

|-

Liberal Party of Australia members of the Parliament of South Australia
Members of the South Australian House of Assembly
Lawyers from Adelaide
People educated at Pembroke School, Adelaide
Living people
1957 births
Adelaide Law School alumni
People from Kangaroo Island, South Australia
21st-century Australian politicians
21st-century Australian women politicians
Women members of the South Australian House of Assembly
Attorneys-General of South Australia
Deputy Premiers of South Australia